Def Jef is the stage name of Jeffrey Fortson (born September 27, 1970), an American alternative hip hop musician and rapper of the late 1980s and early 1990s. He was born in Harlem, New York City.

His debut album was 1989's Just a Poet with a Soul, which won critical acclaim for sociopolitical lyrics and original beats.  Additionally, he was a member of the West Coast Rap All-Stars, a collaboration of West Coast-based hip hop artists who released the anti-violence single "We're All in the Same Gang" in 1990. He performed on the television variety show In Living Color in 1990.

After his second album, Soul Food, was released, Def Jef moved into production full-time.  Since the 1990s, he has produced, written, arranged and remixed artists including Nas, Snoop Doggy Dogg, Mary J. Blige, Kimberley Locke, Maxwell, Avant, Tupac Shakur, and Shaquille O'Neal. He has worked with Krayzie Bone and Thugline Records.

He produced the theme songs for the Disney sitcom That's So Raven and The Game.

Def Jef also appeared in the feature film Deep Cover in 1992.

Discography
1989: Just a Poet with Soul
1990: "We're All in the Same Gang" (single)   (as one of the West Coast Rap All-Stars)
1991: Soul Food

References

External links
 

1966 births
African-American male actors
African-American male rappers
Delicious Vinyl artists
Living people
Male actors from New York City
People from Harlem
Rappers from Manhattan
21st-century American rappers
21st-century American male musicians
21st-century African-American musicians
20th-century African-American people